Xu Qifeng (5 January 1936 – 2 July 2020) was a Chinese engineer specializing in satellite navigation. He was an academician of the Chinese Academy of Engineering (CAE).

Biography
Xu was born in Tianjin, on January 5, 1936. In September 1953, he was accepted to PLA Institute of Surveying and Mapping, where he majored in surveying.
After graduation, he taught at the university.
He died of illness on July 2, 2020.

Works

Honours and awards
 1996 State Science and Technology Progress Award
 2005 Member of the Chinese Academy of Engineering (CAE)
 2006 State Science and Technology Progress Award

References

1936 births
2020 deaths
Engineers from Tianjin
Academic staff of PLA Information Engineering University
Members of the Chinese Academy of Engineering
20th-century Chinese engineers
21st-century Chinese engineers
PLA Information Engineering University alumni